Dorian Caddy (20 March 1995) is a French professional footballer who plays striker.

Club career
Caddy is a youth exponent from Nice. He made his Ligue 1 debut on 23 January 2016 against Lorient. He started in the first eleven before he was substituted for Rémi Walter after 62 minutes in a 2–1 home win.

In January 2016, Caddy was promoted to the Nice first team due to good performances with the CFA team.

In November 2016, Caddy joined Ligue 2 club Clermont on loan for the remainder of the 2016–17 season. The following season he joined newly-promoted Quevilly-Rouen.

In the summer of 2018 Caddy signed for Rodez in Championnat National, and helped the club gain promotion to Ligue 2. At the end of that contract he signed for Laval.

International career
Born in metropolitan France, Caddy is of Martiniquais descent. He is a youth international for France.

Honours
Martigues

 Championnat National 2: 2021–22

References

External links

1995 births
Living people
French footballers
France youth international footballers
French people of Martiniquais descent
Association football forwards
Ligue 1 players
Ligue 2 players
Championnat National players
Championnat National 2 players
Championnat National 3 players
OGC Nice players
US Quevilly-Rouen Métropole players
Rodez AF players
Stade Lavallois players
FC Martigues players